Harry Saputra (born 12 June 1981) is a retired Indonesia footballer. He was called to Indonesia national football team at the 2004 and 2007 AFC Asian Cup as a reserve player.

References

External links

1981 births
Living people
Indonesian footballers
Association football defenders
2004 AFC Asian Cup players
2007 AFC Asian Cup players
Indonesia international footballers
PSB Bogor players
Persija Jakarta players
Persikota Tangerang players
PSIM Yogyakarta players
Persis Solo players
Persema Malang players
PSMS Medan players
Persibo Bojonegoro players
Persib Bandung players
Persebaya Surabaya players
Dewa United F.C. players
Liga 1 (Indonesia) players
Indonesian Premier League players